Gorham School Department is a public school district located in Gorham, Maine. 

It serves Grades K-12 throughout 5 schools. The superintendent, since 2015, has been Heather Perry. The assistant superintendent since 2021 has been Brian Porter.

Schools

Athletics
The district offers the following athletics to students in middle and high school:

Middle School:

-Soccer (Boys and Girls)

-Cross Country (Boys and Girls)

-Field Hockey (Girls only)

-Tennis

-Basketball (Boys and Girls)

-Indoor Track (Boys and Girls)

High School: 

-Cheerleading (Fall, Winter)

-Cross Country (Boys and Girls)

-Field Hockey (Girls)

-Football

-Golf (Co-ed)

-Soccer (Boys and Girls)

-Volleyball (Girls)

-Ice Hockey (Boys and Girls)

-Basketball (Boys, Girls, Unified)

-Indoor Track (Boys and Girls)

-Swimming (Boys and Girls)

-Wrestling (with Westbrook High School)

-Alpine Skiing

-Baseball (Boys)

-Softball (Girls)

-Lacrosse (Boys and Girls)

-Outdoor Track and Field (Boys and Girls)

-Tennis (Boys and Girls)

See also
Gorham School District athletics page

References

School districts in Maine
Gorham, Maine
Education in Cumberland County, Maine